Steven Jesús Pabón Delgao (born 25 July 2001) is a Venezuelan footballer who plays as a centre-back for Venezuelan Primera División club Metropolitanos.

Club career

Metropolitanos
Pabón is a product of Metropolitanos. He got his professional debut for Metropolitanos on 19 May 2018 in a Venezuelan Primera División game against Deportivo Lara.

References

External links
 

Living people
2001 births
Association football defenders
Venezuelan footballers
Venezuelan Primera División players
Metropolitanos FC players
Footballers from Caracas